The 1991–92 season was Leeds United A.F.C.'s 73rd season in their history, their 37th in the top tier of English football and their second consecutive and final season in the Football League First Division before its rebranding as the FA Premier League.

Season summary
Having finished fourth the previous season, this time round Leeds clinched the First Division title, ahead of archrivals Manchester United, in only their second consecutive season as a First Division club. As champions of the Football League, United qualified for the European Cup, which would be rebranded as the UEFA Champions League for the next season. They lost just four league games all season, and were held to 1–1 draws both home and away by Manchester United (who also knocked them out of both domestic cups). Eric Cantona signed for the club in mid-season, making his debut at Oldham Athletic on 8 February 1992, and scored three goals in the remainder of the season. Leeds clinched the title in the penultimate game of the season with a 3–2 win at Sheffield United. The first goal that day was scored by striker Rod Wallace, who had joined Leeds the previous summer from Southampton.

Transfers

Transfers in

†Club record transfer fee at the time.

Transfers out

Loans in

Loans out

Squad

Final league table

Results
Leeds United's score comes first

Legend

Football League First Division

FA Cup

League Cup

Full Members Cup

Player statistics

Goalscorers

Football League First Division
  Lee Chapman 16
  Rod Wallace 11
  Steve Hodge 7
  Gary Speed 6
  Mel Sterland 6
  Gary McAllister 5
  Gordon Strachan 4
  Tony Dorigo 3
  Eric Cantona 3
  David Batty 2
  Carl Shutt 2
  Chris Fairclough 2
  Jon Newsome 2
  Chris Whyte 1
  Mike Whitlow 1

Football League Cup
  Lee Chapman 4
  Gary Speed 3
  Mel Sterland 1
  Carl Shutt 1
  Rod Wallace 1

Full Members Cup
  Rod Wallace 1

Awards
At the end of the season, left-back Tony Dorigo was named the club's Player of the Year.

Notes

References

1991-92
Leeds United
English football championship-winning seasons
Foot